The Neustrashimy class (alternate English spelling Neustrashimyy), Soviet designation Project 11540 Yastreb (hawk), is a series of large frigates built for the Soviet Navy and currently in service with the Russian Navy. Seven ships were planned for the Soviet Navy, but the fall of the Soviet Union disrupted those plans. Two ships were completed, both currently in active service with the Russian Baltic Fleet.

Design and construction
The class was designed as a general purpose anti-submarine warfare (ASW) frigate to follow on from the s. The ship is equipped with a newly designed Zvezda-1 integrated sonar system (with NATO reporting name Ox Tail) as its primary ASW sensor.

The program started in 1986 and seven ships were originally planned. After the collapse of the Soviet Union the project was frozen and only one ship, Neustrashimy (Неустрашимый - "Dauntless"), was in active service with the Russian Baltic Fleet by the mid-1990s. On 24 February 2009 the second ship in the class, Yaroslav Mudry, left the Yantar shipyard in Russia's Kaliningrad for its first sea trials. As of 2010, both Neustrashimy and Yaroslav Mudry are operational with the Baltic Fleet.

The ships were built by Yantar Yard, Kaliningrad. Only Neustrashimy was completed by the time the Soviet Union collapsed. Two further ships were incomplete. Yaroslav Mudry (named after the great ruler of the Kievan Rus, Yaroslav the Wise) and Tuman ("Fog", named after a World War II era Soviet patrol boat whose crew exhibited great valour in combat with three German destroyers). As of 2009, the frigate Yaroslav Mudry began sea trials and entered service.

Service history

2008–2009 deployment to Somalia
In late September 2008, Neustrashimy left the Baltic Fleet and was sent to the Gulf of Aden waters off the Somali coast to fight piracy in the region. Russian navy spokesman Captain Igor Dygalo told the Associated Press that the missile frigate Neustrashimy had left the Baltic Sea port of Baltiisk a day before the hijacking to cooperate with other unspecified countries in anti-piracy efforts. As of 27 October, the frigate was operating independently in the vicinity of a group of NATO warships near the Somali coast. On 16 November 2008, the frigate prevented pirates from capturing the Saudi Arabian ship .

Further deployment
The American destroyer came within  of the Russian vessel.

In April 2018, Yaroslav Mudry and Uda-class oiler Lena were escorted by the Royal Navy frigate  as they were passing through the English Channel en route to the Mediterranean Sea.

Yaroslav Mudry was again seen passing the English Channel on 1 November 2018.

On 1 October 2019, Yaroslav Mudry, tanker Yelnya, and tug Viktor Konetsky embarked on the INDRA-2019 exercise. On 21 October, the frigate under the command of Captain 2nd rank Mikhail Navolotsky paid a visit to the Cypriot port of Limassol and, in early December, patrolled the Gulf of Aden. On 10 December, the ships arrived to Mormugao, India and have been participating in the exercises till 19 December. On 27 December, the ships arrived at the Iranian port of Chakhbehar and participated in joint naval exercise. Between 4-7 January 2020, the ship detachment visited the Omani port of Salalah and afterwards started patrolling the Gulf of Aden again. Between 10-18 February, Yaroslav Mudry paid another visit to Salalah, Oman and between 4-6 March Colombo, Sri Lanka. On 4 May 2020, the ships returned to Baltiysk.

From 2014 Neustrashimy was in overhaul with the deadline for the completion of her refit having passed on several occasions, partly due to the problem of acquiring parts for her Ukrainian-made engines. However, the ship completed her refit in December 2021 and is scheduled to return to the fleet in April 2022. Post-refit sea trials were underway as of February 2022. In July, Neustrashimy was reported to have fired the SA-N-9 air defence missile during its tests at sea.

Project 11541 "Korsar"
United Shipbuilding Corporation developed the escort ship Korsar based on the Neustrahimmy-class. The Project 11541 Korsar escort ship is designed to search for, track, and engage surface, underwater, and air targets, as well as to perform escort and patrol tasks. The ship can carry out a wide range of missions, operating autonomously and within a tactical task force in sea and oceanic areas. The customer can choose as armament between 4 Kh-35 launchers with 16 missiles, 2 P-800 Oniks launchers with 8 missiles, 8 3M-54 Kalibr VLS cells or 2 P-270 Moskit launchers with 8 missiles.

Ships

Building
The work on Tuman was suspended in late 1993 when about 47% complete due to lack of funding. In 1996, the ship was launched to clear space in slip and was subsequently laid up in 1998  to clear space in dry dock. In April 2016, the director of the Yantar shipyard announced the incomplete hulk was to be scrapped as the high cost of completing the ship to an outdated design was considered inefficient and the space freed up by its disposal could be employed on more cost-effective projects.

See also
 List of ships of the Soviet Navy
 List of ships of Russia by project number
 List of naval ship classes in service

References

Sources

External links 

 Project 1154 Neustrashimy class at fas.org
 11540 Ястреб at Belarusian State University Encyclopedia of Ships 
 Проект 11540 «Ястреб» at Atrinaflot.narod.ru 
 All Neustrashimy Class Frigates - Complete Ship List

Frigate classes
 
 
Ships built at Yantar Shipyard

tr:Neustrashimy